Brood is a psychological fiction novel published in 2021 written by American author Jackie Polzin. The novel is told from a first-person perspective and follows the story of an unnamed narrator who tries to care for her small brood of four chickens  Gam Gam, Miss Hennepin County, Gloria and Darkness  over the course of a year.

It won the 2021 Los Angeles Times Book Prize in the Art Seidenbaum Award for First Fiction category.

Synopsis 
The novel follows an unnamed woman who cares for four chickens in Minnesota's harsh environment, facing difficulties such as a brutal winter and a surprise tornado during the sweltering summer. Along the way, the protagonist struggles with predators, bad luck, and an uncertain future that differs from the life she had envisioned. Throughout the novel, readers are introduced to the protagonist's small circle of loved ones, including her mother, her best friend, and her husband, who has his own unique coping mechanisms for dealing with his wife's miscarriage.

Themes 
According to Phoebe Mogharei of Chicago Review of Books, the experience of raising chickens serves as a metaphor for the human experience. The chickens live in the present, with no concept of past or future, and serve as a therapeutic tool for the protagonist to mourn both the past and present.

Reception 

Critical reviews of Brood were generally favorable. Tanya Gold of The Spectator praises Polzin's writing style, describing it as "obsessive" and "addictive"compared to that of Joan Didion, but without the "insufferable parts".

Jennifer Reese of the Washington Post highlights the beauty and importance of the mundane tasks of daily life, such as cleaning and caring for a flock of chickens. Despite the seemingly unexciting plot, Reese finds the novel to be "fascinating" and "captivating", as the protagonist's struggles against entropy and chaos are relatable to readers who have experienced the challenges of the COVID-19 pandemic.

Elizbeh McCraken of the New York Times called it "companionable", "cozy", "smart", and "empathetic", and emphasize that it will be meaningful to many people for many reasons.

References 

2021 American novels
Psychological novels
Psychological fiction
Domestic workers in fiction
Doubleday (publisher) books
Novels set in Minnesota